Kaag is a village in the Dutch province of South Holland.

The village of Kaag lies on an island called Kagereiland in the Kager Lakes (Kagerplassen). To reach De Kaag, a ferry can be taken from Buitenkaag all year or Zevenhuizen in the summer months.

De Kaag is also part of an area called the Duin- en Bollenstreek ("Dune and Bulb Region").

The village is conventionally referred to as "De Kaag", but the name reported on both English and Dutch maps is just "Kaag".

History 
The village is first mentioned in 1308, called "Kaghe", meaning "lands outside the dike". Kaag developed as a dike village on the island Kagereiland in the Kagermeer. Until the end of the 16th century De Kaag was the largest settlement in the Alkemade area. The island received its current shape between the Haarlemmermeer was poldered in 1852.

Gallery

References

Populated places in South Holland
Kaag en Braassem